The finals and the qualifying heats of the Women's 100 metres Breaststroke event at the 1998 European Short Course Swimming Championships were held on the first day of the competition, on Friday 11 December 1998 in Sheffield, England.

Finals

Qualifying Heats

See also
1996 Women's Olympic Games 100m Breaststroke
1997 Women's World SC Championships 100m Breaststroke
1997 Women's European LC Championships 100m Breaststroke
1998 Women's World LC Championships 100m Breaststroke
2000 Women's Olympic Games 100m Breaststroke

References
 Results
 Swimsite

B
E
1998 in women's swimming